The 29th Primetime Emmy Awards were held on Sunday, September 11, 1977. The ceremony was broadcast on NBC. It was hosted by Angie Dickinson and Robert Blake.

The top shows of the night were Mary Tyler Moore, which, in its final season, won its third consecutive Outstanding Comedy Series Award, it also became the first comedy series to gain eleven major nominations (since broken). Upstairs, Downstairs, also in its final season, won its third Outstanding Drama Series Award in four years (it competed as a miniseries in 1976, and won that category too). But the overwhelming champion of the ceremony was the miniseries Roots.

Roots set several milestones and broke multiple records during the night. It became the first show to receive at least twenty major nominations (21). Adding its nominations in Creative Arts categories, its total expands to 37. Both records still stand for all shows. It was the first show to gain every nomination in an acting category. Its thirteen acting nominations tied the record set the previous year by Rich Man, Poor Man, however all of Roots nominations came in the miniseries category, while Rich Man, Poor Man had nominations cross over into the drama series field. Roots became the first miniseries, and second show overall, along with All in the Family in 1972, to win six of seven major categories. All but one of Roots eight episodes were nominated for major awards (Part VII).

Other distinctions included Mary Kay Place winning a Major Acting award for a TV show (Mary Hartman, Mary Hartman) that had no major network, only broadcast in Syndication - the first time this rare feat has occurred. Also, with actress Rita Moreno's win for her guest appearance on The Muppet Show, she became the third person after Richard Rodgers and Helen Hayes to achieve all four major entertainment awards (EGOT).

With this ceremony, the Primetime Emmys began a long residency at the Pasadena Civic Auditorium that would continue until 1997.

Winners and nominees

Programs

Acting

Lead performances

Supporting performances

Single performances

Directing

Writing

Most major nominations
By network 
 ABC – 59
 CBS / NBC – 48
 PBS – 14

 By program
 Roots (ABC) – 21
 Mary Tyler Moore (CBS) – 11
 M*A*S*H (CBS) – 9
 Eleanor and Franklin: The White House Years (ABC) – 8
 Family (ABC) / Raid on Entebbe (NBC) – 6

Most major awards
By network 
 ABC – 13
 CBS – 11
 NBC – 9
 PBS – 2

 By program
 Roots (ABC) – 6
  Sybil (NBC) – 3

Notes

References

External links
 Emmys.com list of 1977 Nominees & Winners
 

029
1977 television awards
1977 in California
September 1977 events in the United States